Kwadwo Ani is one of Ghana's premier contemporary artists.  Ani was born in Accra, Ghana, in 1966.  He studied at the Ghanatta College of Art and the Ankle College of Art. He has participated in many group and solo exhibitions throughout Ghana and internationally. His work is held in collections at the Alliance Francaise, Ghana; Ghana Broadcasting Corporation; and the Ministry of Culture of China.

Kwadwo Ani recently completed a touring exhibition in Europe sponsored by the British Royal Overseas League.  In 2004, Ani won a residency in the Vermont Studio Center sponsored by the Ford Foundation.

His recent work plays on Ani-kese, which translates to "Big Eye" – Ani in his native language means Eye. In the distinctive childlike style of his recent work, he strives to portray the world around him through big, wide open eyes, with the honesty and sincerity that only a naïve child possesses. His works provoke instant laughter, or sometimes fear.

External links
African Encounters Kwadwo Ani's west coast representatives
Gallery of selected Kwadwo Ani artwork
Kwadwo Ani (a brief autobiography)

1966 births
Living people
21st-century Ghanaian painters
Male painters
21st-century Ghanaian male artists
People from Accra